Artistry in Rhythm is an album by pianist and bandleader Stan Kenton featuring performances recorded in 1946 and originally released on the Capitol label as four 78rpm discs, reissued as a  LP in 1953, and then as a  LP in 1955 with additional tracks.

Reception

The Allmusic review by Scott Yanow observed: "It's a fine sampling of Stan Kenton's mid-'40s orchestra."

Track listing
All tracks were composed by Stan Kenton except where noted:

 "Come Back to Sorrento" (Ernesto De Curtis) – 3:07
 "Just A-Sittin' and A-Rockin'" (Duke Ellington, Billy Strayhorn, Lee Gaines) – 2:46 Additional track on 12-inch LP
 "Fantasy" – 2:46
 "Opus in Pastels" – 2:45
 "Soothe Me" (Joe Greene) – 3:08 Additional track on 12-inch LP
 "Cocktails for Two" (Arthur Johnston, Sam Coslow) – 2:59 Additional track on 12-inch LP
 "Artistry in Bolero" (Milt Raskin, Pete Rugolo) – 3:00
 "Ain't No Misery in Me" (Gene Roland) – 2:59
 "Safranski (Artistry in Bass)" (Rugolo) – 3:09
 "Santa Lucia" (Teodoro Cottrau) – 3:14 Additional track on 12-inch LP
 "Willow Weep for Me" (Ann Ronell) – 3:14 
 "Artistry in Percussion" (Rugolo) – 3:09

All tracks were recorded at Radio Recorders in Hollywood, California, United States, North America over a five-year period on the following dates:

October 30, 1945 (track 2)
June 4, 1946 (track 1)
July 12, 1946 (track 7–9 & 12)
July 19, 1946 (track 6)
July 25, 1946 (track 11)
July 26, 1946 (track 3)
August 2, 1946 (track 4)
September 24, 1947 (track 5)
September 14, 1950 (track 10)

Personnel
The musicians recorded for the album included:

Stan Kenton – piano, conductor, arranger
Alfred "Chico" Alvarez (tracks 1 & 3–12), John Anderson (tracks 1–4, 6–9, 11 & 12), Russ Burgher (track 2), Buddy Childers (tracks 1–9, 11 & 12), Maynard Ferguson (track 10), Ken Hanna (tracks 1, 3–9, 11 & 12), John Howell (track 10), Bob Lymperis (track 2) Al Porcino (tracks 5 & 10), Shorty Rogers (track 10), Ray Wetzel (tracks 1–9, 11 & 12)  – trumpet 
Milt Bernhart (tracks 5 & 10), Eddie Bert (tracks 5 & 10), Harry Betts (tracks 5 & 10), Bob Fitzpatrick (track 10), Harry Forbes (tracks 3–5 & 11), Milt Kabak (tracks 1, 2, 6–9 & 12), Jimmy Simms (track 2), Miff Sines (tracks 1, 3, 4, 6–9, 11 & 12), Kai Winding (tracks 1, 3, 4, 6–9, 11 & 12) Freddie Zito (track 2) – trombone 
Bart Varsalona – bass trombone
Al Anthony (tracks 1–4, 6–9, 11 & 12), Boots Mussulli (tracks 1–4, 6–9, 11 & 12), Frank Pappalardo (track 5), Art Pepper (track 10), Bud Shank (track 10), George Weidler (track 5) – alto saxophone 
Bart Caldarell (track 10), Bob Cooper, Vido Musso (tracks 1–4 & 6–12), Warner Weidler (track 5) – tenor saxophone
Bob Gioga – baritone saxophone
Pete Rugolo – piano (track 1)
Bob Ahern (tracks 1–4, 6–9, 11 & 12), Laurindo Almeida (tracks 5 & 10) – guitar 
Don Bagley (track 10), Eddie Safranski (tracks 1–9, 11 &7 12) – bass 
Ralph Collier (track 2), Shelly Manne (tracks 1 & 3–12) – drums
Jack Costanzo – bongos (track 5)
Miguel Rivera – congas (track 10) 
June Christy – vocals (tracks 2, 5, 8 & 11)
Stan Kenton (tracks 3 & 4), Gene Roland (tracks 2 & 8), Pete Rugolo (tracks 1, 5–7 & 9–12) – arranger

See also
Stan Kenton

References

External links

Stan Kenton albums
1946 albums
Capitol Records albums
Albums arranged by Pete Rugolo
Albums conducted by Stan Kenton
Albums arranged by Stan Kenton
Albums arranged by Gene Roland